John Conway (born 11 July 1951) is an Irish former footballer, who played in the 1960s and 1970s.

John was a midfielder who played his schoolboy football for the Stella Maris 
before moving on to  Bohemians amongst others during his career in the League of Ireland. He made 2 appearances in European competition for Bohs and won the FAI Cup with the club in 1970. Between 1971 and 1975, Conway played for English side Fulham. He only played 38 league matches for Fulham, scoring six goals.

Conway then moved to Switzerland to sign for FC Winterthur. He came home to sign for Shamrock Rovers in February 1976 under manager Mick Meagan but returned to Winterthur in 1977. He retired in 1981 and now lives in Germany.

His more famous brother Jimmy also had a spell at Bohemians before moving abroad.

Honours
FAI Cup:
 Bohemians - 1970
 League of Ireland Cup:
 Shamrock Rovers - 1976/77

References

 The Hoops by Paul Doolan and Robert Goggins

1951 births
Living people
Republic of Ireland association footballers
Republic of Ireland expatriate association footballers
League of Ireland players
Bohemian F.C. players
Shamrock Rovers F.C. players
Fulham F.C. players
English Football League players
FC Winterthur players
Stella Maris F.C. players
Association football wingers